Ahmad Faizal bin Azumu (Jawi: أحمد فيصل بن ازومو; born 10 June 1970), nicknamed Peja, is a Malaysian politician who served as the Minister of Youth and Sports in the Barisan Nasional (BN) administration under former Prime Minister Ismail Sabri Yaakob from August 2021 to the collapse of the BN administration in November 2022, Special Advisor to the Prime Minister Muhyiddin Yassin in the Perikatan Nasional (PN) administration for only 11 days in August 2021, 12th and 13th Menteri Besar of Perak from May 2018 to his resignation and collapse of the Pakatan Harapan (PH) state administration in March 2020 and again from March 2020 to his resignation again and the collapse of the PN state administration in December 2020. He also served as the Member of Parliament (MP) for Tambun and Member of the Perak State Legislative Assembly (MLA) for Chenderiang from May 2018 to November 2022. He is a member, Deputy President and State Chairman of Perak as well as Pahang of the Malaysian United Indigenous Party (BERSATU), a component party of the ruling PN coalition at the federal level and former component party of the PH opposition coalition at both the federal and state levels. He was the State Chairman of PH of Perak. He was one of the only two Menteris Besar of Malaysia who has ruled in two state administrations of two different and opposing political coalitions, which were PH state administration from May 2018 to his resignation and its collapse in March 2020 and PN state administration from March 2020 to his resignation and its collapse in December 2020. 

He was removed from office of the Menteri Besar of Perak after losing the motion in 2020 vote of no confidence in the Perak State Legislative Assembly on 4 December, and he served in caretaker capacity for another day despite his intention to only resign once the appointment of a new officeholder and formation of a new state administration take place.

Background and education

Ahmad Faizal was born in Ipoh, Perak. He received his primary education at Cator Avenue School, Ipoh and had his secondary education at Anderson School, Ipoh. He holds a Professional Masters degree in Political Science from Universiti Teknologi Malaysia in Kuala Lumpur, Malaysia.

Political career
He began his political career as a Special Officer to Health Minister Liow Tiong Lai between 2011 and 2013 before becoming Senior Special Officer to Kedah Mentri Besar Mukhriz Mahathir between 2013 and 2016. He is also formerly served in the Special Affairs Department (JASA).
 
He was the former United Malays National Organisation (UMNO) Ipoh Barat Youth chief (2016–2017) before he became Perak BERSATU chairman. He was subsequently named Perak Pakatan Harapan chairman in August 2017. He was appointed as Special Advisor to the Prime Minister Muhyiddin Yassin on 5 August 2021, who is in charge of advising Muhyiddin on matters related to community networking, community communications and socioeconomic development.

Controversies
Ahmad Faizal was reported to have pursued a Business Studies degree from Edith Cowan University in Perth, Australia. He however denied the reports and claimed that while he did pursue the course he had to put his studies on hold due to personal reasons. Ahmad Faizal holds a Masters Degree in Political Science from Universiti Teknologi Malaysia.

Ahmad Faizal has been very critical of the Orang Asli indigenous tribes ever since he took office as Menteri Besar. On 23 November 2018, Ahmad Faizal made a statement that the Orang Asli should improve themselves before asking for aid. On 29 July 2019 Ahmad Faizal claimed that there is no definition or recognition of ancestral or customary land (tanah adat) for Orang Asli under the state constitution. It was refuted by fellow PH's MP, Ramkarpal Singh and the Malaysian Bar. During his administration, many Orang Asli residents were arrested for protesting over the state government's decision to acquire their land for logging activities.

On 13 June 2022, he made a statement on Twitter about Malaysian football supporters due to the Malaysian football team losing against Bahrain in Bukit Jalil National Stadium, causing a backlash from supporters. He later apologized.

Filmography

Drama 

Discography
Moh Perak Ke Kita (Moh Beraya) ft Shiha Zikir and Dato Jamal Abdillah

Personal life
He is married to Dr Nomee Ashikin Mohammed Radzi and has two children. His sister-in-law who is Dr Nomee's younger sister; Nolee Ashilin Mohamed Radzi is the UMNO turned independent and later hopped to BERSATU Tulang Sekah constituency MLA since 2008.

Election results

Honours

Honours of Malaysia
  :
  Knight Grand Commander of the Order of the Perak State Crown (SPMP) – Dato' Seri (2018)

See also
 Tambun (federal constituency)
 Chenderiang (state constituency)
 2020 vote of no confidence in the Faizal Azumu ministry

References

External links
 

1970 births
Living people
People from Perak
Malaysian people of Malay descent
Malaysian Muslims
Malaysian businesspeople
Malaysian United Indigenous Party politicians
Former United Malays National Organisation politicians
Members of the Dewan Rakyat
Members of the Perak State Legislative Assembly
Chief Ministers of Perak
Perak state executive councillors
21st-century Malaysian politicians